Romano Espinoza (18 November 1898 – 1 May 1957) was a Peruvian artist. His work was part of the art competition at the 1932 Summer Olympics.

References

1898 births
1957 deaths
Peruvian artists
Olympic competitors in art competitions
People from Lima Region